Sixlets are small round candy-coated, chocolate-flavored candy made by Oak Leaf Confections, a Chocolat Frey company based in Toronto, Ontario, Canada. They are often sold in thin cellophane packages that hold them in a tube-like formation. The United States Food and Drug Administration recognized that Sixlets are safe for human consumption during a 1961 study. The ball-shaped candies come in colors that include red, brown, yellow, green, blue and orange. Each color is purported to add a slightly different taste than the others to the candy. An Easter variation of the candy adds white, pink, and blue pieces while removing red and brown ones from the mix. A Christmas variation has only red, green and white; and the Valentine's Day variation has red, pink, and white. Halloween versions are also sold, having orange, teal, purple, green, and black candies. At some specialty candy stores, Sixlets can be found sold loose by weight in individually sorted colors not found in the typical variety- lime green, black, pink, etc.- in the same way that M&M's are popularizing designer color selection. They are also packaged for sale as decoration for baked goods.

History 
Sixlets have existed since at least 1960 and were originally made by Leaf Brands. A candy brand with a similar name that was also made by Leaf in the 1960s was called Fivesomes. Fivesomes were a miniature version of Whoppers that, like Sixlets, also came in cellophane wrapping. In 1996, Hershey purchased the North American confectionery operations of Leaf, Inc., including such brands as Jolly Rancher, Heath Bar, Whoppers, Chuckles, Milk Duds and Sixlets.  In 2003, Hershey Foods Corporation sub-licensed their rights to the Sixlets brand name to SweetWorks Confections LLC.

One hypothesis for the name's origin is that the candy, when originally manufactured, was sold six for a penny in a bubble gum-like machine. Although the candies are currently sold in a variety of packages, the most comparable to the original is an eight-ball cellophane pack sold in bags containing several servings. A six-ball tube was introduced in 2017.

References

External links 
Sixlets Corporate webpage

Canadian confectionery